Qaleh-ye Hajji Mazid (also Romanized as Qal‘eh-ye Ḩājjī Mazīd) is a village in Kut-e Abdollah Rural District, in the Central District of Karun County, Khuzestan Province, Iran. At the 2006 census, its population was 334, in 61 families.

References 

Populated places in Karun County